High mobility group nucleosome-binding domain-containing protein 3 is a protein that in humans is encoded by the HMGN3 gene.

Thyroid hormone receptors are hormone-dependent transcription factors that regulate expression of a variety of specific target genes. The protein encoded by this gene binds thyroid hormone receptor beta, but only in the presence of thyroid hormone. The encoded protein, a member of the HMGN protein family, is thought to reduce the compactness of the chromatin fiber in nucleosomes, thereby enhancing transcription from chromatin templates. Two transcript variants encoding different isoforms have been found for this gene.

References

Further reading

External links